Mr. Five Percent can refer to:
Calouste Gulbenkian; commonly spelled "Mr Five Per Cent"
Yasuo Hamanaka

See also 

Mr. Ten Percent
Asif Ali Zardari